German submarine U-76 was a Type VIIB U-boat of Nazi Germany's Kriegsmarine during World War II. She played a minor role in the Battle of the Atlantic, but was destroyed south of Iceland.

Design
German Type VIIB submarines were preceded by the shorter Type VIIA submarines. U-76 had a displacement of  when at the surface and  while submerged. She had two shafts and two  propellers.

U-76 was fitted with five  torpedo tubes (four fitted at the bow and one at the stern), fourteen torpedoes, one  SK C/35 naval gun, 220 rounds, and one  anti-aircraft gun The boat had a complement of between forty-four and sixty.

Service history
She was laid down at Bremer Vulkan in Bremen on 28 December 1939 as yard number 4. She was launched on 3 October 1940 and commissioned on 9 December.

U-76 was available for service from March 1941 following the completion of her working-up period and sea trials. Her commander, Kapitänleutnant (Kptlt.) Friedrich von Hippel, had previously served in  during her trials until November the previous year.

War patrol
Six days into her first and only patrol on 2 April, U-76 sank the Finnish steam merchant ship SS Daphne which was on her way to Lillehammer, Norway. All twenty-two crew members were killed in the attack.

The next day, U-76 followed the mostly British convoy SC 26 travelling from Sydney, Nova Scotia to Liverpool. The U-boat fired a torpedo at the British merchantman , disabling the vessel.

The attack attracted the attention of the armed escort vessels, who pinpointed her position. Forty-two of her forty-three-man crew survived and were captured.

Summary of raiding history

References

Notes

Citations

Bibliography

External links

U-76 Interrogation report

German Type VIIB submarines
U-boats commissioned in 1940
U-boats sunk in 1941
World War II submarines of Germany
1940 ships
World War II shipwrecks in the Atlantic Ocean
Ships built in Bremen (state)
U-boats sunk by depth charges
U-boats sunk by British warships
Maritime incidents in April 1941